Just the Beginning is the debut studio album by then 13-year-old American singer-songwriter Grace VanderWaal, consisting of twelve original tracks. It is VanderWaal's first full-length project and follows her debut EP, Perfectly Imperfect (2016).

The album was released on November 3, 2017, by Columbia Records and Syco Music, produced by Ido Zmishlany, Tim Sommers, Sean Douglas, Greg Wells and Gregg Wattenberg, among others. It debuted on the Billboard 200 albums chart at number 22. In advance of the album's release, VanderWaal released several singles from the album and promoted it with various live and broadcast appearances, and she further promoted it with her sold-out Just the Beginning Tour, which ran from November 2017 to February 2018. VanderWaal has writing credits for every song on Just the Beginning.

Background and promotion
By early 2017, VanderWaal began working on the album, telling Billboard that it will be "more produced ... really the same sound ... [but] less acoustic" than her debut EP, Perfectly Imperfect (2016). She has said that her process changed for the album from her previous efforts, because she was writing songs "on demand" with a collaborator: "I've never done this before; it's kind of weird to go into a room with usually a 30-year-old man and just be like 'Oh, let me open up about my life to you and write a super personal song!'" VanderWaal has writing credits for every song on Just the Beginning.

On May 21, 2017, VanderWaal previewed "Burned" and "Just a Crush" at her benefit concert at The Valley Hospital in New Jersey. On June 21, as part of VidCon's opening show, YouTube OnStage, at Anaheim Convention Center in California, she premiered the first single from the album, "Moonlight". On July 20, 2017, she released her first official music video, for "Moonlight", which has accumulated more than 45 million views on YouTube. Her television promotions of the album began on August 15, with a return to America's Got Talent as a guest performer singing "Moonlight". She won the competition in 2016. On August 11, she released a second single from the album, "Sick of Being Told". On September 4, VanderWaal performed "Moonlight" on Live with Kelly and Ryan. She released a third single from the album, "So Much More Than This", on September 14. VanderWaal performed "Moonlight" on The Ellen DeGeneres Show on September 18, 2017. She released a promotional single from the album, "Escape My Mind", on October 5, 2017. VanderWaal performed new songs from the album at the Austin City Limits Music Festival in October. On October 26, 2017, VanderWaal released a second promotional single, "City Song". She appeared on Total Request Live on November 2 to promote the album and sing "So Much More Than This".

VanderWaal released Just the Beginning on November 3, 2017. She sang "Moonlight" on Megyn Kelly Today on the release date and began her first solo tour, the Just the Beginning Tour, on November 5, 2017, to promote the album. By September 2017, the 13-city tour had sold out. Later in November, she promoted the album in Japan with performances and interviews. In December, she released a music video for "So Much More Than This". In January 2018, VanderWaal released a music video for "City Song". The tour concluded in February 2018.

Production
Producers on the album include Ido Zmishlany, Tim Sommers, Sean Douglas, Greg Wells, Gregg Wattenberg, Derek Fuhrmann, Mike Adubato and Michel Heyaca. Recording and mixing were performed at VsTheWorld Studios, Brooklyn, New York (tracks 1, 7, 8, 12 and 14), VanderWaal's home (track 1), Hourglass Studio, New York, New York (track 2), Westlake Studios, Los Angeles, California (track 3), Rocket Carousel Studio, Los Angeles, California (tracks 4, 10 and 13), Arcade Studios, New York, NY (tracks 5, 6, 9 and 11) and Platinum Sound Recording Studios, New York, New York (tracks 7, 8, 12 and 14).

Reception
Before the album was released, reviewers commented on the individual song releases: Gil Kaufman of Billboard magazine wrote that "Moonlight" "displays a fun tropical beat making it the perfect summer song" and that it "digs a little deeper" and "displays maturity". Raisa Bruner of Time commented that the song "maintains [VanderWaal's] acoustic flair while layering in a lightly tropical touch". Jon Caramanica of The New York Times opined the album "sounds like steroidal bluegrass-inflected space-pop", and VanderWaal's vocal "sounds emotionally exhausted, like a singer twice her age, or more." Lisa Nguyen of Paste wrote of "Sick of Being Told": "The track is a catchy tune with poppy beats that perfectly capture [VanderWaal's] youthful spirit." Ali Booth, in Tiger Beat, stated: "We haven’t been able to get ... 'So Much More Than This' out of our heads since she released it last month!" A critic for Dallas Observer wrote that the same track "has a simple beat, but it explodes with sound when the chorus hits." The headline of People magazine's review of "Escape My Mind" said that the song "will make you think about it all the time", and reviewer Nicole Sands called it a "catchy upbeat song".

Nicholas Hautman of Us Weekly wrote that the album "transcends the comparisons [to Swift] that have followed [VanderWaal] since AGT. ... Throughout the refreshing LP, VanderWaal channels the folky twang of Swift's earlier projects, but intertwines the sounds of fellow musicians Florence Welch, Regina Spektor and even Miley Cyrus". Selina Fragassi of the Chicago Sun-Times commented that VanderWaal's "raspy-sweet-peculiar vocals recall Elle King, Regina Spektor and Katy Perry ... [and] proves herself a modern-day Mozart".  The Buffalo News, reviewer opined: "The album tackles a wide range of scenarios and emotions, well beyond her 13 years, in 12 magnificently crafted tracks. VanderWaal entrances listeners with the pop masterpieces of 'Florets' and 'City Song', while conveying raw, powerful emotion in 'A Better Life' and 'Darkness Keeps Chasing Me'. It is this vast diversity in her songwriting that makes her stand out as a truly unique and exquisite artist." USA Today's review of the album noted:

Commercial performance
In the United States, the album debuted at number 22 on the Billboard 200 with 21,000 album-equivalent units, which included 17,000 traditional album sales.

Track listing

Personnel
Adapted from the liner notes.

 Mike Adubato – accordion ; percussion ; drum programming ; keyboards ; piano ; Pro Tools; producer
 Raymond Argueta – engineer
 Dylan Brady – ukulele 
 Sarah Bromley – product manager
 John Doelp – A&R
 Sean Douglas – instrumentation , producer
 Jeremy Dussolliet – background vocals 
 Dave Eggar – cello , cello arrangement, string arrangements, strings
 Mark Endert – mixing
 Derek Fuhrmann – drum programming ; guitar ; bass guitar ; keyboards ; percussion ; producer; background vocals 
 Michel Heyaca – vocal engineer
 Bruno Jornada – assistant
 Dave Kutch – mastering
 Jordan Miller – background vocals 
 Zoë Moss – background vocals 
 Jeremy Nichols – engineer
 Andrew Pertes – bass ; upright bass 
 Che Pope – engineer
 Pierre-Luc Rioux – bass, guitar 
 Olivia Smith – art direction, design
 Tim Sommers – bass; drums , guitar; keyboards ; background vocals ; engineer; mixing; percussion; producer; ukulele
 Grace VanderWaal – bass ; glockenspiel ; bass guitar; percussion ; ukulele ; vocals; background vocals 
 Olivia Vanderwaal – percussion ; background vocals 
 Gregg Wattenberg – drums ; engineer; classical guitar ; guitar ; acoustic guitar; bass guitar ; keyboards ; producer; ukulele ; background vocals 
 Mia Wattenberg – background vocals 
 Greg Wells – engineer; instrumentation ; mixing; producer; guitar 
 Paul Westlake – photography
 Mark Williams – A&R
 James Wooten – engineer, string arrangements, strings , strings contractor
 Ido Zmishlany – bass ; drums ; engineer; guitar ; keyboards ; mixing; producer; programming; string arrangements; strings; ukulele ; background vocals 
 Joe Zook – mixing

Charts

References

External links
 VanderWaal's official page for the album on her website
 Album trailer for Just the Beginning
 VanderWaal at the Austin City Limits Music Festival, October 7, 2017, the first live performance of several songs from the album
 Official tour recap video (2018)

2017 debut albums
Albums produced by Gregg Wattenberg
Columbia Records albums
Grace VanderWaal albums
Syco Music albums